Edward Barber (died 1674?), was an English Baptist minister.

Barber was originally a clergyman of the established church, but long before the beginning of the civil wars he adopted the principles of the baptists. He had numerous followers, who assembled for worship in the Spital in Bishopsgate Street, London, and appear to have been the first congregation among the baptists that practised the laying on of hands on baptised believers at their reception into the church. This custom was introduced among them about 1646 by Mr. Cornwell. Previously to the year 1641 Barber was kept eleven months in Newgate Prison for denying the baptism of infants and that the payment of tithes to the clergy was God's ordinance under the gospel. He preached his doctrines in season and out of season, and he has himself left an account of the disturbance he caused in 1648 in the parish church of St. Benet Fink. The date of his death is unknown, but in 1674 he was succeeded in the care of the Baptist church in Bishopsgate by Jonathan Jennings.

He is the author of: 1. ‘To the King's most Excellent Maiesty, and the Honourable Court of Parliament. The humble Petition of many his Maiesties loyall and faithfull subjects, some of which having beene miserably persecuted by the Prelates and their Adherents, by all rigorous courses, for their Consciences, practising nothing but what was instituted by the Lord Jesus Christ,’ &c., London, 1641, s. sh. fol. This petition, which prays for liberty of worship for the baptists, is signed ‘Edward Barber, sometimes Prisoner in Newgate for the Gospel of Christ.’ 2. ‘A small Treatise of Baptisme, or, Dipping, wherein is cleerely shewed that the Lord Christ ordained Dipping for those only that profess repentance and faith. (1) Proved by Scriptures; (2) By Arguments; (3) A parallel betwixt circumcision and dipping; (4) An answer to some objections by P[raisegod] B[arebone],’ London, 1641, 4to. 3. ‘A declaration and vindication of the carriage of Edward Barber, at the parish meeting house of Benetfinck, London, Fryday the 14 of Iuly 1648, after the morning exercise of Mr. Callamy was ended, wherein the pride of the Ministers, and Babylonish or confused carriage of the hearers is laid down,’ London, 1648, 4to. 4. ‘An Answer to the Essex Watchmens Watchword, being 63 of them in number. Or a discovery of their Ignorance, in denying liberty to tender consciences in religious worship, to be granted alike to all,’ London, 1649, 4to.

References

Year of birth missing
1674 deaths
English religious writers
Writers from London
17th-century English writers
17th-century English male writers
17th-century English Baptist ministers
17th-century English Anglican priests